Rostislav Vojáček (born 23 February 1949 in Křenovice) is a Czech former football defender. He played for Czechoslovakia, for which he played 40 matches and scored one goal.

He was participant in the 1982 FIFA World Cup and a member of the bronze team in the 1980 UEFA European Championship.

In his country he played for Baník Ostrava, for which he played 381 league matches and scored 26 league goals. Vojáček contributed to the best period in the history of the club. During his years as a player of the club, Baník won the Czechoslovak First League in 1976, 1980 and 1981. Baník also won the Czechoslovak Cup in 1973 and 1978.

In 2000, he briefly coached Baník Ostrava.

References
 

1949 births
Living people
People from Přerov District
Czechoslovak footballers
Czech footballers
Association football defenders
UEFA Euro 1980 players
1982 FIFA World Cup players
FC Baník Ostrava players
Czechoslovakia international footballers
Czech football managers
FC Baník Ostrava managers
Sportspeople from the Olomouc Region